William Hamilton Sewell (November 27, 1909 – June 24, 2001) was a United States sociologist and the chancellor of the University of Wisconsin–Madison during the 1967–1968 school year. He is the father of William H. Sewell Jr.

Biography
Sewell was born on November 27, 1909, in Perrinton, Michigan. He attended Michigan State University, where he received his BA in 1933 and his MA in 1934, both in sociology. He then attended the University of Minnesota, where he received his Ph.D. in sociology in 1939 with a dissertation supervised by F. Stuart Chapin. He briefly taught at Michigan State and Oklahoma State before he became a professor of sociology at the University of Wisconsin in 1946, where he became the chancellor in 1967.

Sewell was known for his research in the sociology of inequality, especially in schooling, as well as his empirical approach to sociology.

Sewell became chancellor of the Madison campus in 1967, in the midst of the Vietnam War and student protests. After a tough year due to the protesting, in June 1968, he resigned as chancellor and returned to research and teaching. In 1971 Sewell served as president of the American Sociological Association. He was elected to the United States National Academy of Sciences in 1976 and the American Philosophical Society in 1979.

Personal life
Sewell was the father of William H. Sewell Jr., also a sociologist. Sewell, Sr.  died in Madison, Wisconsin, in 2001.

Selected works

References

External links
 Chancellors and Presidents of the University of Wisconsin–Madison

People from Gratiot County, Michigan
American sociologists
Sociology educators
Leaders of the University of Wisconsin-Madison
Michigan State University alumni
University of Minnesota College of Liberal Arts alumni
Michigan State University faculty
Oklahoma State University faculty
Presidents of the American Sociological Association
1909 births
2001 deaths
Members of the American Philosophical Society
20th-century American academics